Padonmar Stadium ( is a multi-use stadium, located in Yangon, Myanmar. The 3,000-seat stadium is smaller but more up-to-date than Aung San Stadium, and is the venue of choice for most national and international level football and track and field competitions.

References
padonmar

External links
Padonmar Stadium

Football venues in Myanmar
Buildings and structures in Yangon
Sport in Yangon